Marvin & Tige (1983), also titled Like Father, Like Son, is an American drama film directed by Eric Weston and written by Wanda Dell and Eric Weston based on a novel by Frankcina Glass. Marvin (played by John Cassavetes), a heavy-drinking widower who has seen better days and makes a living taking odd jobs, meets suicidal youngster Tige.

Cast
John Cassavetes as Marvin Stewart
Billy Dee Williams as Richard Davis
Gibran Brown as Tige Jackson
Denise Nicholas as Vanessa Jackson (as Denise Nicholas-Hill)
Fay Hauser as Brenda Davis
Georgia Allen as Carrie Carter

External links

1983 films
1983 drama films
American drama films
Films scored by Patrick Williams
Films based on American novels
Films directed by Eric Weston
1980s American films